The economy of Montserrat was severely disrupted by volcanic activity which began in July 1995. Prior to this date, the small island country of 12,000 had an export economy based on agriculture, clothing, electronic parts and plants, with a per capita gross national product of US$3,000 to 8,000.

Montserrat had an international reputation as a tourist getaway, and the record producer George Martin established an important recording studio there, Associated Independent Recording. Destroyed by Hurricane Hugo in 1989, the studio was never reestablished; however, Martin subsequently helped found the Montserrat Cultural Centre, which was opened in 2007. Some of the funds were raised in a London concert called  "Music for Montserrat" (September 15, 1997).

Collapse 
A catastrophic eruption of Soufrière Hills in June 1997 closed the W. H. Bramble Airport and seaport at Plymouth, causing further economic and social dislocation. Two-thirds of the inhabitants fled the island. Some began to return in 1998, but lack of housing limited the number.

The agriculture sector continued to be affected by the lack of suitable land for farming and the destruction of crops. Prospects for the economy depend largely on developments in relation to the volcano and on public sector construction activity. The UK launched a three-year $122.8 million aid program to help reconstruct the economy. Half of the island was expected to remain uninhabitable for another decade.

Today, Montserrat's main economic activity is in construction and government services which together accounted for about 50 percent of GDP in 2000 when it was EC$76 million. In contrast, banking and insurance together accounted for less than 10 percent of GDP. The unemployment rate in 1998 was estimated at 6 percent. Montserrat's domestic financial sector is very small and has seen a reduction in offshore finance in recent years with only 11 offshore banks remaining. Real GDP declined from EC$122 million in 1995 to about EC$60 million in 1999, with the rate of decline peaking at -21.5 percent for 1996. The decline in economic activity reflected in large part the completion of major projects in both the private and public sectors. However, the rate of decline slowed markedly since 2000 and 2001, when GDP contracted by less than 3 percent. In 2002, the GDP growth rate reverted to a positive 4.6 percent reversing the declining trend over the past six years and maybe more.

New Town 
The Montserrat Development Corporation was an entity founded by the Government of Montserrat and the Department for International Development in 2008. The company's primary mandate was to help foster private sector investment and development on the island. The company had announced plans to develop the new town of Little Bay on the northwest coast of Montserrat between Brades and Davy Hill, however an internal audit of the company in 2015 led to the company's dissolution. The audit revealed that the company was not being prudent with the government's funds.

Slated for completion by 2020, the new town will be the new focus of tourism, trade and housing and will also house the seat of government.

References